"Live It Up" is a song by Australian rock band Mental As Anything, released in May 1985 in Australia and then in Europe and the United States in 1986 and 1987 after the song's appearance in the film Crocodile Dundee. At the 1985 Countdown Australian Music Awards, the song won Best Single.

Background
"Live It Up" was written by Mental As Anything keyboardist and singer Greedy Smith. Smith did not initially think the song would be a hit when he wrote it, but became more confident as the song was completed; he explained, "You know when I felt that was going to be a hit? When we finished mixing it. It took about half an hour to write in my head. But then two years to get it right. We had no idea of how big it would be."

After the song's success, Smith did not seek to directly replicate its style. He later said, "it's not about duplicating the song, you have to duplicate all the conditions around it. Which is an art in itself. It's not really that possible. It's a bit like cricket. You can't understand how a team can win or lose, but it's just the vibe of it as Michael Caton would say."

Release and reception
"Live It Up" appears on the band's 1985 album, Fundamental. It was released in Australia as the album's second single in May 1985 and quickly climbed the Kent Music Report chart to peak at No. 2 for three weeks behind Madonna's "Angel / Into the Groove". It spent 12 weeks in the Top 10, becoming the fourth biggest-selling single of 1985 in Australia.

The single was later released in 1986 and 1987 in Europe after it was featured in the hit film Crocodile Dundee. "Live It Up" is the band's most successful and most popular song, reaching the top 20 in various countries. The song peaked at No. 2 in Ireland, No. 3 in the UK, No. 4 in Norway, No. 6 in Germany and New Zealand, No. 15 in Austria and No. 20 in Sweden.

Greedy Smith later recounted the single's success. "And I remember when 'Live It Up' went to number three in the UK… that was a special moment. It had been a hit in Australia but nobody was interested over there and in Europe. Then, when Crocodile Dundee came out, our record company over there said 'Let's put the poster on the single pack. After that, it was a huge hit. So we were very grateful to have a bit of a go around there."

"Live It Up" has been placed in the collection of the Australian National Film and Sound Archive, with the song being described as "wistful and yet danceable". The song was also used in the 2018 horror film, The Strangers: Prey at Night.

In 2020, the song became an unofficial anthem of Glasgow based football team Rangers FC to mock their city rivals Celtic FC and in December 2020 after the clubs ultras group The Union Bears featured it in a video on their social media accounts mocking Celtic for losing the Glasgow derby. Rangers fans began a campaign to get the song to number one in the UK charts for Christmas.

Live performances
"Live It Up" remains a mainstay of Mental As Anything's live setlist. Greedy Smith explained, "We mainly concentrate on the songs that people know off the radio: 'If You Leave Me', 'Too Many Times', 'Live It Up', 'Romeo and Juliet', 'Rock and Roll Music'."

Track listings

Charts

Weekly charts

Year-end charts

References

1985 songs
1985 singles
1986 singles
1987 singles
APRA Award winners
Columbia Records singles
Epic Records singles
Mental As Anything songs
Song recordings produced by Richard Gottehrer
Songs written by Greedy Smith
Warner Music Australasia singles